Facundo Castet (born 11 September 1998) is an Argentine professional footballer who plays as a left-back for Temperley, on loan from Sarmiento.

Career
Castet began his senior career in the ranks of Sarmiento, a team that signed him from Bragado Club in 2013; who he joined following a stint with Argentinos Juniors. Iván Delfino initially promoted the defender into the first-team during the 2017–18 Primera B Nacional campaign, selecting him on the substitutes bench for home fixtures against Mitre, Instituto and Brown; though he never made it onto the field. He started the opening thirteen fixtures of 2018–19, including for his professional bow versus Olimpo on 26 August 2018; with Castet assisting Nicolás Orsini's winning goal. On 15 May 2022, Castet joined Temperley on loan for the rest of the year.

Career statistics
.

References

External links

1998 births
Living people
Sportspeople from Buenos Aires Province
Argentine people of French descent
Argentine footballers
Association football defenders
Primera Nacional players
Club Atlético Sarmiento footballers
Club Atlético Temperley footballers